Damián Cirillo (born 17 January 1980 in San Isidro, Argentina) is an Argentine former professional footballer who played as a forward.

Clubs
 Tigre 1997–2000
 Temperley 2000–2001
 Atlético Uruguay 2001–2002
 Defensa y Justicia 2002
 FC Locarno 2003–2007
 Atlético Bucaramanga 2008
 Juventud Antoniana 2008–2009
 Sportivo Belgrano 2009
 Universitario 2010
 Los Andes 2011
 Sol de América 2011
 UAI Urquiza 2011–2012
 Talleres (RE) 2012
 Sarmiento (R) 2013–2013
 Club Social y Deportivo Alianza 2013–2014
 Club Atlético Colegiales (Concordia) 2015
 Independiente Fontana 2017
 Club Deportivo El León 2017

References
 
 

1980 births
Living people
People from San Isidro, Buenos Aires
Sportspeople from Buenos Aires Province
Argentine footballers
Association football forwards
Club Atlético Tigre footballers
Club Atlético Los Andes footballers
Defensa y Justicia footballers
FC Locarno players
Talleres de Remedios de Escalada footballers
Juventud Antoniana footballers
Club Sol de América footballers
Atlético Bucaramanga footballers
Universitario de Sucre footballers
Argentine expatriate footballers
Argentine expatriate sportspeople in Bolivia
Expatriate footballers in Bolivia
Argentine expatriate sportspeople in Colombia
Expatriate footballers in Colombia
Argentine expatriate sportspeople in Paraguay
Expatriate footballers in Paraguay
Argentine expatriate sportspeople in Switzerland
Expatriate footballers in Switzerland